St. John's School, in Vancouver, British Columbia, is an independent, co-educational, non-religious, IB World School for junior kindergarten to grade 12 students.

St. John's School is accredited by the British Columbia Ministry of Education. The school is a member of the Federation of Independent Schools Association (FISA), the Canadian Accredited Independent Schools (CAIS), and the Independent Schools Association of British Columbia (ISABC). St. John's offers the International Baccalaureate's Primary Years Programme, Middle Years Programme and the Diploma Programme.

History and future expansion
St. John's was founded in 1986 as St. Andrew's School Society with fewer than 100 students from grades 3 through 10. In 1996, St. John's School purchased the present school facility in Kitsilano and, as part of the school's growth and expansion, land adjacent to the current location has been acquired and developed. The building of the senior school was completed in September 2011. The building includes 11 classrooms and the Gunn gym which is largest gym of any independent school in the Lower Mainland, in addition to the older gym next door. A new connecting building between the Junior and Senior school was opened in mid 2019 as the Arts and Science Center. It also houses the largest smart board in all of the Lower Mainland.

Students
As of 2020 there were 570 students in grades junior kindergarten to 12, with the Junior School running from junior kindergarten to grade 5 and the Senior School from grades 6 to 12.

Academics 
St. John's School is an IB World School offering the International Baccalaureate's Primary Years Programme (junior kindergarten to grade 5), Middle Years Programme (grades 6–10) and the Diploma Programme (grades 11 and 12).

St. John's is a university preparatory school. Full-time university advisors provide students with support as they apply to university.

Athletics 

St. John's athletics teams compete in the Greater Vancouver Independent Schools Athletic Association (GVISAA), which is recognized by BC School Sports, the Independent Schools Association (ISA), the Independent Schools Elementary Association (ISEA), the Canadian Association of Independent Schools (CAIS) and provincially at the Single A level.

St. John's has a variety of sports teams including:
 Badminton (team and recreational)
 Basketball
 Cross country running
 Golf (team and recreational)
 Soccer
 Ski and snowboard
 Track and field
 Ultimate
 Volleyball

St John's also has academic clubs such as Debate, School Reach, and offers the Duke of Edinburgh's Award program.

Calendar
The school year runs September through June and is composed of three terms. Most courses are linear (year-long) in nature.

References

External links

Elementary schools in Vancouver
High schools in Vancouver
Private schools in British Columbia
Preparatory schools in British Columbia
Educational institutions established in 1986
1986 establishments in British Columbia